Unpleasant Horse is a side-scrolling platform game developed by 4th and Battery for iOS, a subsidiary of PopCap Games. The protagonist of the game is a black "horse" (though technically a pegasus), which the user must direct across the level by having the horse bounce on clouds, and on the backs of white horses. This causes the white horses to fall onto meat grinders at the bottom of the level; if the user misdirects the black horse when trying to hit a cloud or a white horse, then the black horse itself falls onto the meat grinders.

The game was believed to be rejected from the App Store for "mature content" on April 7, 2011 due to a miscommunication; it was still undergoing review. Unpleasant Horse is no longer available on the iOS App Store.

References

2011 video games
Platform games
Horse-related video games
Side-scrolling video games
Android (operating system) games
IOS games
Pegasus in popular culture
PopCap games
Video games developed in the United States